Mother Barbara Micarelli School is a Catholic educational institution inspired by the spirit of St. Francis of Assisi. Its foundation was built in 1991. The Assistant Principal is Josie Villanueva And The principal is  Sr. Emma Valenzuela, FMIJ and with Sr.Pia Pizillo the School Directress. The exact location is at General Santos Ave. San Miguel, Sto. Tomas, Batangas, Philippines. The assistant principal is Josie Villanueva.

Catholic elementary schools in the Philippines
Catholic secondary schools in the Philippines